Megalagrion is a genus of damselflies in the family Coenagrionidae. It contains approximately 26 species, all of which are endemic to Hawaii.

Nymphal Megalagrion live in widely diverse habitats, including the expected streams and pools.  Megalagrion also exploit some surprising habitats such as plant leaf axils, waterfall faces, and even damp fern litter far from water sources.  M. oahuense is the only species of damselfly whose naiad is terrestrial, living in damp fern litter until metamorphosis.

Many species of Megalagrion are in danger due to habitat loss and predation by non-native fish. To protect them, non-native fish should never be released in Hawaiian streams.

The genus contains the following species:
Megalagrion adytum  - adytum swamp damselfly
Megalagrion amaurodytum 
Megalagrion blackburni 
Megalagrion calliphya 
Megalagrion deceptor 
Megalagrion dinesiotes 
Megalagrion eudytum 
Megalagrion hawaiiense 
Megalagrion heterogamias 
Megalagrion jugorum  - Maui upland damselfly, (Maui, Critically Endangered)
Megalagrion kauaiense 
Megalagrion koelense  - Koele mountain damselfly
Megalagrion leptodemas  - crimson Hawaiian damselfly
Megalagrion mauka 
Megalagrion molokaiense  - Molokai damselfly
Megalagrion nesiotes  - flying earwig Hawaiian damselfly
Megalagrion nigrohamatum  - nigrohamatum damselfly
Megalagrion oahuense  - Oahu damselfly
Megalagrion oceanicum  - oceanic Hawaiian damselfly
Megalagrion oresitrophum 
Megalagrion orobates 
Megalagrion pacificum  - Pacific Hawaiian damselfly
Megalagrion paludicola  - Kauai bog damselfly
Megalagrion vagabundum 
Megalagrion williamsoni 
Megalagrion xanthomelas  - orangeblack Hawaiian damselfly

References

Coenagrionidae
Endemic fauna of Hawaii
Taxa named by Robert McLachlan (entomologist)
Zygoptera genera